Harshada Garud is a weightlifter from Maharashtra, India. Winning a gold in 2022 Junior World Weightlifting Championships, she became the first Indian to win a gold medal in International Weightlifting Federation's World Juniors Weightlifting Championships.

Biography 
Harshada Garud is born on 8 November 2003, at Vadgaon Maval near Pune, Maharashtra. Harshada's father Sharad Garud, is also a weightlifter, who had won weightlifting silver at state school games. She is studying B.A. at Savitribai Phule Pune University.

Weightlifting career 
In 2022, Harshada Garud won gold medal in the World junior weightlifting championships held at Heraklion, Greece. She is the first Indian to win a gold medal in World Juniors Weightlifting Championships. She had also won U-17 girls weightlifting gold medal at the 2020 Khelo India Youth Games and bronze medal at the 2020 Asian junior championships in Tashkent. She also won third rank in 45 kg junior woman category, in IWLF Youth, Junior & Senior National Weightlifting Championships 2021-22 held at Bhubaneswar, Odisha.

References 

2003 births
Living people
Indian female weightlifters
Women from Maharashtra
Weightlifters from Maharashtra
21st-century Indian women